The  Tennessee Titans season was the franchise's 35th season in the National Football League (NFL), their 45th overall and their eighth in the state of Tennessee. The Titans attempted to improve upon their previous output of 12–4, but only managed to win five games for the season. The Titans missed the playoffs for the first time since 2001, and this was their worst record since 1994 when they were still based in Houston.

The season is notable when the team lost three starters from the famed 1999 team; lineman Jevon Kearse went to the Philadelphia Eagles, running back Eddie George was released before the season, and would later sign with the Dallas Cowboys, while tight end Frank Wycheck retired after the 2003 season.

Personnel

Staff

Roster

Schedule

Preseason

Regular season 
In addition to their regular games with AFC South division rivals, the Titans played games against the AFC West and NFC North according to the NFL’s schedule rotation, and also played games against the Dolphins and the Bengals based upon finishing positions from 2003.

Standings

References 

2004
Tennessee Titans
Titans